Till Midnight may refer to:

Till Midnight (song), 1984	song by Evelyn "Champagne" King from So Romantic
Till Midnight (album), 2014